Dylan Phillip Everett (born January 24, 1995) is a Canadian actor. He is best known for his roles in How To Be Indie (2009–2011), Wingin' It (2010–2013), Degrassi (2012–2013), and Open Heart (2015).

Life and career 
Everett played Streeter in the Canadian children's series The Doodlebops for two episodes. He then played roles in the movies The Devil's Mercy, Booky & the Secret Santa, Everything Is Connected, Breakfast with Scot, For All the Marbles, and made a guest appearance in The Dresden Files as Scott Sharpe. He played 'Big Ben' in the Family Channel series The Latest Buzz. He also voiced 'Wolfy' in the series Super Why!.

He then appeared in other roles, until his 2009 How To Be Indie casting as Marlon Parks, and in 2010 the lead character in the Family Channel series Wingin' It. He reprised his character as Marlon Parks to film a second series of YTV's How To Be Indie, which premiered in Canada, in fall 2010.

Everett also filmed a second and third season with Wingin' It. In February 2012 he was cast as Campbell Saunders, an ensemble character in Degrassi.

In 2014, he played the role of Mark-Paul Gosselaar in Lifetime TV's The Unauthorized Saved by the Bell Story. He also appeared in three episodes of Supernatural as a teenage Dean Winchester.

Filmography

Awards

References

External links 
 

1995 births
Living people
Canadian male child actors
Canadian male television actors
Male actors from Hamilton, Ontario
21st-century Canadian male actors